Debórah Dwork is an American historian, specializing in the history of the Holocaust. She is the Founding Director of the Strassler Center for Holocaust and Genocide Studies and  formerly served as the Rose Professor of Holocaust History at Clark University in Worcester, Massachusetts.

Education and career
Dwork earned a B.A. from Princeton University in 1975, an M.P.H. from Yale University in 1978, and a Ph.D. from University College London in 1984. After postdoctoral studies at the Smithsonian Institution, she joined the faculty of the University of Michigan in 1984, and moved to the Yale Child Study Center at Yale University in 1989. She took her current position as Rose Professor at Clark University in 1996. She has held fellowships  from the Guggenheim Foundation, the American Council of Learned Societies, and the Woodrow Wilson International Center for Scholars, and has served as the Shapiro Senior Scholar-in-Residence at the United States Holocaust Memorial Museum and as a visiting scholar at Rutgers University.

Dwork is the founding Director of the Strassler Center for Holocaust and Genocide Studies at Clark University, and a delegate to the International Holocaust Remembrance Alliance.

Academic work
In her first book, War is Good for Babies and Other Young Children (1987), Dwork examined questions about the family, the role of women, and the concept of children's rights in the context of the development of the modern welfare system.

Dwork  moved from the history of childhood as a social construct to the history of children as subjects and actors.  Her historical analysis used children's experiences as a lens through which to view all of society.  In her Children With A Star (1991), she presented the daily lives of young people caught in the net of Nazisim. The book became the subject of a documentary of the same name by the Canadian Broadcasting Corporation.

Auschwitz, 1270 to the Present (1996), co-authored with Robert Jan van Pelt, demonstrated the connection between industrial killing and the daily functions of a society that believed it was involved in constructive activity. The book uses architectural evidence to understand Auschwitz. The  book received the National Jewish Book Award and the Spiro Kostof Award.

Dwork's book Voices and Views: A History of the Holocaust (2002)  is an edited, annotated, and illustrated collection used by the national Holocaust education program of the Jewish Foundation for the Righteous.
Dwork and van Pelt also collaborated on Holocaust: A History, which  discusses the place of the Holocaust in the overall history of Europe, from the Middle Ages to the middle of the twentieth century.  It explores how the different occupation regimes shaped the local populations' ability to respond to the genocide enacted outside their windows.  It  integrates the history of World War II and the history of the Holocaust.

In Flight from the Reich (2009), Dwork and van Pelt turned their attention to the question of refugee Jews from 1933  through the postwar period.

Dwork edited and annotated The Terezin Album of Mariaka Zadikow (2008), a posie album collected by a Jewish inmate as the Germans pushed forward with deportations from Theresienstadt. In A Boy in Terezin: The Private Diary of Pavel Weiner, April 1944 – April 1945 (2011), she returned to the experiences of children as an important source for contemporaneous accounts of Jewish life under Nazi persecution.

Personal life 
Dwork is the daughter of mathematician Bernard Dwork, and sister of computer scientist Cynthia Dwork.

Film Credits
Dwork has served as the historian of record on and off film in feature-length and TV documentaries. These include director Rick Trank's "Against the Tide" (2008) and "Unlikely Heroes" (2003), and the Ken Burns/Artemis Joukowsky documentary, "Defying the Nazis" (2016).  Television documentaries include "Hiding in Plain Sight" (CBS, 2009) and "Misha Defonseca and her Hoax Memoir," (RTBF, Belgian National TV, 2008).

Bibliography
 Dwork, Debórah (2012). A Boy in Terezin: The Private Diary of Pavel Weiner, April 1944 – April 1945. Evanston: Northwestern University Press. .
 Dwork, Debórah; van Pelt, Robert (2009). Flight from the Reich: Refugee Jews, 1933–1946. New York: W.W. Norton. . Translations: Dutch (Elmar); French (Calmann-Lévy).
 Dwork, Debórah (2008). The Terezin Album of Marianka Zadikow. Chicago: University of Chicago Press. .
 Dwork, Debórah; van Pelt, Robert (2008). Auschwitz. New York: W.W. Norton & Co. . First published as: Auschwitz 1270 to the Present. New York: Norton. . Translations: Czech (Argo); Dutch (Boom); German (Pendo); Polish (Swiat Ksiazki).
 Dwork, Debórah; van Pelt, Robert (2002). Holocaust: A History. New York: Norton. . Translations: Dutch (Boom); Portuguese (Imago); Spanish (EDAF).
 Dwork, Debórah (2002). Voices and Views: A History of the Holocaust. New York: Jewish Foundation for the Righteous. .
 Dwork, Debórah (1991). Children With A Star: Jewish Youth in Nazi Europe. New Haven: Yale University Press. . Translations: Dutch (Boom); German (Beck); Italian (Marsilio); Japanese (Sogen Sha).
 Dwork, Debórah (1987). War Is Good for Babies and Other Young Children: A History of the Infant and Child Welfare Movement in England 1898–1918. London; New York: Tavistock Publications. .

References

External links
Debórah Dwork Academic homepage.
Debórah Dwork Personal homepage.
Strassler Center for Holocaust and Genocide Studies Homepage.

Year of birth missing (living people)
Living people
University of Michigan faculty
Yale University faculty
Clark University faculty
Historians of Nazism
Historians of the Holocaust
Jewish American historians
Scholars of antisemitism
21st-century American historians
American women historians
Social constructionism
21st-century American women